Micrurapteryx tortuosella is a moth of the family Gracillariidae. It is known from Kyrgyzstan and Tajikistan.

The larvae feed on Lathyrus species (including Lathyrus odoratus), Medicago species (including Medicago sativa) and Melilotus species. They mine the leaves of their host plant. The mine has the form of a blotch mine.

References

Gracillariinae
Moths described in 1985